Westchester/Veterans station is an at-grade light rail station on the K Line of the Los Angeles Metro Rail system. It is located alongside Florence Avenue near its intersection of Hindry Avenue, located in the Westchester neighborhood of Los Angeles, but across the street from the city of Inglewood. 

The station opened on October 7, 2022. Metro held a ceremonial ribbon cutting ceremony for the station on September 17, 2022.

The station serves as the initial southern terminus of the line until through-routing with the C Line commences.

The station incorporates artwork by the artist Geoff McFetridge. Hindry station was funded and fully incorporated into the project in May 2013 after significant community support.

Service

Station layout

Hours and frequency

Connections 
, the following connections are available:
Los Angeles Metro Bus:  (Metro C & K Line Link shuttle to Aviation/LAX station)
Big Blue Bus (Santa Monica): 14

Notable places nearby 
 
The station is within walking distance of the following notable places:
Centinela Adobe
Randy's Donuts

References 

K Line (Los Angeles Metro) stations
Railway stations in the United States opened in 2022